Harvey Stephens (August 21, 1901 – December 22, 1986) was an American actor, known initially for his performances in Broadway productions, and thereafter for his work in film and on television. He was most active in film beginning in the 1930s and through the mid-1940s. Beginning in the mid-1950s, he transitioned to television and enjoyed success there through the 1960s.

Stephens was also an avid competitive glider pilot. He was inducted into the Soaring Hall of Fame in 1966 for his contributions to the sport.

Early years 
Stephens was born in Los Angeles. As a student at the University of California at Los Angeles, he earned letters in basketball and football. Before he turned to acting, Stephens worked in western copper mines and Mexican oil fields in addition to working around the world on a freighter.

Stage 

Stephens' debut in the theater came in 1920 at the Pilgrimage Play in Hemet, California. Following that, he toured for two years in a troupe headed by Walter Hampden and worked in stock theater companies in several cities.

On Broadway, Stephens appeared as Sam Worthing in Other Men's Wives, written by Walter C. Hackett, late in 1929. He also appeared as Richard Wadsworth in Dishonored Lady (1930); as Gail Redman in Tomorrow and Tomorrow (1931); as Joe Fisk in The Animal Kingdom (1932); Fred Barton in Best Years (1932); Bruce Blakely in The Party's Over (1933); and John Palmer in Conquest (1933). He also appeared in South Pacific as Commander Harbison, alongside Mary Martin; he was one of only two cast members who did not sing.

Film 
Stephens made his leading debut opposite Tallulah Bankhead in The Cheat (1931). After appearing in The Texans (1938) and The Oklahoma Kid (1939), he began appearing in many Western films, although he also appeared with Gary Cooper, Joan Leslie, and Walter Brennan in Sergeant York (1941).

Television 
Stephens appeared on a number of television shows beginning in the early 1950s and continuing through the late 1960s, including The Aquanauts, Ripcord, 77 Sunset Strip, Ben Casey and The Many Loves of Dobie Gillis, as well as multiple episodes of Alfred Hitchcock Presents, Wagon Train, Bat Masterson, Perry Mason, and Bonanza.

Activities outside of acting 
Beginning in the late 1930s, Stephens was one of the earliest major proponents of gliders, and pursued an interest in the sport throughout his life. In 1937, Harland Ross custom built a glider for Stephens, which became the Ross RS-1 Zanonia (The "RS" designation stands for "Ross-Stephens"). He organized a number of competitions and was still participating after his retirement from acting into the 1960s.

Personal life
On January 20, 1946, Stephens married Barbara Adams, a stage director. He had previously been married to stage actress Beatrice Nichols.

Partial filmography

 The Cheat (1931) – Jeffrey Carlyle
 Paddy the Next Best Thing (1933) – Jack Breen
 Jimmy and Sally (1933) – Ralph Andrews
 The Worst Woman in Paris? (1933) – John Strong
 Sleepers East (1934) – Martin Knox (uncredited)
 Evelyn Prentice (1934) – Lawrence Kennard
 After Office Hours (1935) – Tommy Bannister
 One New York Night (1935) – Collis
 Baby Face Harrington (1935) – Ronald
 Let 'Em Have It (1935) – Van Rensseler
 The Murder Man (1935) – Henry Mander
 Orchids to You (1935) – George Draper
 It's in the Air (1935) – Sidney Kendall
 Whipsaw (1935) – Ed Dexter
 Tough Guy (1936) – Chief Davison
 Robin Hood of El Dorado (1936) – Capt. Osborne
 Absolute Quiet (1936) – Barney Tait
 The Three Wise Guys (1936) – Ambersham
 Sworn Enemy (1936) – District Attorney Paul Scott
 All American Chump (1936) – Jim Crawford
 Maid of Salem (1937) – Dr. John Harding
 Murder Goes to College (1937) – Paul Broderick
 Swing High, Swing Low (1937) – Harvey Howell
 King of Gamblers (1937) – J.G. Temple
 Night of Mystery (1937) – Dr. Von Blon
 Forlorn River (1937) – Les Setter
 Night Club Scandal (1937) – Frank Marsh
 Dangerous to Know (1938) – Philip Easton
 Tip-Off Girls (1938) – Chief Agent Jason Baardue
 The Texans (1938) – Lt. David Nichols
 The Oklahoma Kid (1939) – Ned Kincaid
 The House of Fear (1939)
 You Can't Get Away with Murder (1939) – Fred Burke
 Grand Jury Secrets (1939) – Michael Keefe
 Sherlock Holmes and the House of Fear (1939) – Richard 'Dick' Pierce
 Beau Geste (1939) – Lieutenant Martin
 Abe Lincoln in Illinois (1940) – Ninian Edwards
 The Fighting 69th (1940) – Major Anderson
 Parole Fixer (1940) – Bartley Hanford
 Stagecoach War (1940) – Neal Holt
 When the Daltons Rode (1940) – Rigby
 The Texas Rangers Ride Again (1940) – Ranger Blair
 Sergeant York (1941) – Captain Danforth
 Our Wife (1941) – Dr. Cassell
 Joe Smith, American (1942) – Freddie Dunhill
 The Lady Is Willing (1942) – Dr. Golding
 The Courtship of Andy Hardy (1942) – Roderick O. Nesbit
 Tombstone, the Town Too Tough to Die (1942) – Morgan Earp
 George Washington Slept Here (1942) – Jeff Douglas
 Lady in the Dark (1944) – Liza's Father
 The Story of Dr. Wassell (1944) – Captain in Charge of Evacuation (uncredited)
 Three Young Texans (1954) – Jim Colt
 Cell 2455, Death Row (1955) – Prison Warden
 The Girl in the Red Velvet Swing (1955) – Dr. Hollingshead DDS
 Oregon Passage (1957) – Capt. Boyson
 The World Was His Jury (1958) – Judge Arthur Farrell
 Official Detective "Tinseled Alibi" – Houston – (1958)
 The Young Lions (1958) – Brig. Gen. Sam Rockland (uncredited)
 In Love and War (1958) – Amory Newcombe
 North by Northwest (1959) – US Intelligence Agency official (uncredited)
 The Bat (1959) – John Fleming
 The Flight That Disappeared (1961) – Walter Cooper
 Diary of a Madman (1963) – Louis Girot
 Advance to the Rear (1964) – Gen. Dunlop (uncredited)
 Joy in the Morning (1965) – Dr. Marson

References

External links 

 
 

Male actors from Los Angeles
1901 births
1986 deaths
20th-century American male actors
American male stage actors
American male film actors
Glider pilots